Chrysopogon is a genus of tropical and subtropical plants in the grass family. They are widespread across Eurasia, Africa, Australia, southeastern North America, and various islands.

Species

Source:

Formerly included
 

Source:

Research 
In 2022, a new species Chrysopogon densipaniculatus was added to the genus. It is peculiar in that it bears glands on the peduncle, and palea in the pedicelled spikelets are reduced tridentate scale. This species is so far only known from Chhattisgarh, India.

References

 
Poaceae genera
Andropogoneae